HMS Advice was a 50-gun fourth rate ship of the line of the Royal Navy, built at Southampton to the dimensions laid down in the 1741 proposals of the 1719 Establishment, and launched on 26 February 1745.

Advice served until she was broken up in 1756.

Notes

References

Lavery, Brian (2003) The Ship of the Line - Volume 1: The development of the battlefleet 1650-1850. Conway Maritime Press. .

Ships of the line of the Royal Navy
1745 ships